Walter Comyn, Lord of Badenoch (died 1258) was the son of William Comyn, Justiciar of Scotia and Mormaer or Earl of Buchan by right of his second wife.

Life
Walter makes his first appearance in royal charters as early as 1211–1214. In 1220, he accompanied King Alexander II of Scotland during the latter's visit to York. He appears as "Lord of Badenoch" as early as 1229, after the defeat of the Meic Uilleim by his father.

Like his father, Walter was given the hand of an heiress, Isabella, Countess of Menteith.

By 1234, Isabella had inherited the Mormaerdom of Menteith, and so Walter became Mormaer or Earl of Menteith by right of his wife (jure uxoris).  
Walter appears to have had a son named Henry who witnessed a charter, dated to 1250, of Maol Domhnaich, Mormaer of Lennox. 
His daughter Isabel was given in marriage to Gilchrist Mure.

Walter was one of the leading political figures in the Kingdom of Scotland, especially during the minority of King Alexander III, when, along with Alan Durward, he essentially ran the country.  
He died suddenly in either the October or November 1258.

By this time, his son Henry must have been dead. Isabella remained countess until 1260–1261, when Walter Stewart, husband of Isabella's sister Mary, seized the province.  As Walter had no surviving male children, the Lordship of Badenoch passed to Walter's nephew John. John was unable to inherit Menteith.

He is remembered primarily in the proverbial expression Walter of Guiyock's curse,  encountered in Sir Walter Scott's Rob Roy, under the English and Lowland form of his name, Walter Cuming, where it appears in chapter 29:  

The origin of this is  related in Sir Walter Scott's note at that page:

An accident such as this was supposed to be a curse akin to that dealt upon Walter Cuming for his sins. It was thus that the expression originated.

Notes

References
 
 Paul, James Balfour, The Scots Peerage, Vol. VI, (Edinburgh, 1909)
 Young, Alan, Robert the Bruce's Rivals: The Comyns, 1213-1314, (East Linton, 1997)

1258 deaths
Walter
13th-century mormaers
Year of birth unknown
Mormaers of Menteith
Lords of Badenoch